Shopping malls in the Czech Republic are listed in this article.

Brno
 Avion Park Brno (1998)
 Olympia Brno (1999)
 Galerie Vankovka (2005)
 Tesco Královo Pole (2004)

Hradec Králové
 Futurum Hradec Králové (2000)

Karlovy Vary
 Fontana Tesco (2003)

Liberec
 Galerie Liberec Plaza (2008)
 Nisa Centrum (2008)

Mladá Boleslav
 Bondy Centrum (2007)
 Olympia Mladá Boleslav

Olomouc
 Olympia Olomouc (2004)
 Olomouc City (2003)

Ostrava
 Futurum Ostrava (2000)
 Avion Park Ostrava (2001)
 OC Galerie (2005)
 Nová Karolína (2012)
 OC Géčko Ostrava (2018)
 Outlet Arena Moravia (2018)

Plzeň
 Pilsen Plaza (2007)
 Olympia Plzeň (2004)
 Centrum Borská Pole (1999)

Prague
 Bílá labuť (1939)
 Kotva Department Store (1975)
  (in Černý Most, 1997)
 Obchodní centrum Letňany (1999)
 Nový Smíchov (2001)
 Europark Štěrboholy (in Štěrboholy, 2002)
  (2002)
  (formerly Palác Flora, 2003)
  (2005)
  (2005)
 Westfield Chodov (formerly Centrum Chodov) (2005)
 Šestka (2006)
 Palladium (2007)
  (2008)
  (2010)
 Quadrio (2014)

References 

Czech Republic
Shopping malls in the Czech Republic
Shopping malls